Saulx-les-Chartreux is a commune in the Essonne department in the southern suburbs of Paris, France. It is located 20 kilometres from the center of Paris.

History
The name of the city come from a tree: Saule (willow tree in French). Monks built a monastery in this village during the 11th century, and lived there until the Wars of Religion in 1592, when Condé soldiers came to burn the place.

On 11 July 1973, Varig Flight 820 crashed near the village, just before arriving in Orly airport.  123 people died, and 11 survived.

Population

Inhabitants of Saulx-les-Chartreux are known as Salucéens in French.

Notable people
 Adolphe Adam (musician and composer) lived in Saulx-les-Chartreux

Places and monuments
Notre Dame de l'Assomption, church built during 11th and 16th centuries
Forest with specific geologic place

See also
Communes of the Essonne department

References

External links

 Saulx Les Chartreux website 

Mayors of Essonne Association 

Communes of Essonne